This list contains the names of individuals involved in the German resistance to Nazism, but is not a complete list. Names are periodically added, but not all names are known. They tried to overthrow the National Socialist regime, they denounced its wars as criminal, tried to prevent World War II and sabotaged German attacks on other countries. Some tried to protect those who were being harmed and persecuted by the Nazis, others merely refused to contribute to the Nazi war effort. Most of those on the list worked with others; their affiliated resistance group or groups are listed. Where no group is mentioned, the individual acted alone.

A 
 Anton Ackermann (real name: Eugen Hanisch, 25 December 1905 Thalheim, Saxony - 4 May 1973 East Berlin) was an East German politician
  (1876–1951) Deutsche Demokratische Partei (DDP), National Committee for a Free Germany in Switzerland
 Wolfgang Abendroth (1906–1985) KPO, Neu Beginnen, ELAS
  (1894–1949) DDP
 Robert Abshagen (1911–1944), KPD
 Alexander Abusch (1902–1982), KPD
  (1888–1943), SPD, supporter of Polish resistance group organized by Ignaz Hulka
  (1918–1995), White Rose
 Edgar André (1894–1936), KPD
  (1885–1960), SPD
Agnes Asche (1881–1966), SPD member, arrested for distributing illegal newspapers
 Rosa Aschenbrenner (1885–1967), Rote Hilfe
 Judith Auer (1905–1944), Saefkow-Jacob-Bästlein Organization
  (1905–1975) SPD, International Transport Workers' Federation
 Hermann Axen (1916–1992), KPD

B 

 Bruno Bachler, Edelweißpiraten
 Lagi von Ballestrem (1909–1955), Solf Circle
  (1897–1945), KPD
 Karl Baier (1887–1973), Rote Hilfe
  (1881–1931), KPD
 Karl Barth (1886–1968), theologian, Confessing Church
  (1906–1944), KPD
 Bernhard Bästlein (1894–1944), Bästlein-Jacob-Abshagen Group and Saefkow-Jacob-Bästlein Organization
 Albert Battel (1891–1952), Wehrmacht
 Herbert Baum (1912–1942), KJVD, Herbert Baum Group
 Marianne Baum (1912–1942), Herbert Baum Group
  (1911–1988), SPD-RK
  (1905–1938), KPD
 Arno Behrisch (1913–1989), Socialist Workers' Party of Germany, ITF
  (1896–1997), Catholic church
 Hans Beimler (Communist) (1895–1936), KPD
 Walter Beling (1899–1988), Résistance
  (1895–1942), KPD
 Helene Berg (1906–2006)
  (1914–2011), IKD, secretary of Oskar Schindler
  (1913–2005) KPO
  (1877–1949), Rote Hilfe
 Gustav Bermel (1927–1944), Ehrenfeld Group
 Eberhard Bethge (1909–2000), student of Dietrich Bonhoeffer
 Wilhelm Beuttel (1901–1944), Rote Hilfe
  (1890–1945), Wehrmacht, Operation Radetzky
 Dagobert Biermann (1904–1943), KPD
 Charlotte Bischoff (1901–1994), KPD, Red Orchestra
 Peter Blachstein (1911–1977), Socialist Workers' Party of Germany, SJVD, Neuer Weg Group
  (1901–1943), KPD
 Willi Bleicher (1907–1981), KPD, unionist
  (1900–1965), Socialist Front
  (1906–1941), Socialist Workers' Party of Germany, SJVD
  (1906–1942), KPD
 Gustav Böhrnsen (1914–1998) SPD, unionist
 Hermann Böse (1870–1943), Communist resistance
 Walter Bohne (1903–1944), Bästlein-Jacob-Abshagen Group
  (1904–1943), Rote Hilfe
 Eugen Bolz (1881–1945), Zentrumspartei
 Dietrich Bonhoeffer (1906–1945), Confessing Church
 Klaus Bonhoeffer (1901–1945), Confessing Church
 Erwin Bowien (1899–1972), Painter and author
  (1897–1968), KPD
 Willy Brandt (1913–1992), Socialist Workers' Party of Germany
 Otto Brass (1875–1950), Deutsche Volksfront
 Willi Bredel (1901–1964), KPD
 Rudolf Breitscheid (1874–1944), SPD
 Otto Brenner (1907–1972), Socialist Workers' Party of Germany
  (d. 1944), KPD
 Hermann Brill (1895–1959), Neu Beginnen, Deutsche Volksfront, Buchenwald Popular Front Committee
  (1886–1944), SPD
 Paul Bromme (1906–1975), Sopade, RSD
 Arnolt Bronnen (1895–1959), Willy Fred
  (1893–1944), KPD, Bästlein-Jacob-Abshagen Group
  (1889–1944), KPD, Bästlein-Jacob-Abshagen Group
 Eberhard Brünen (1906–1980), Socialist Workers' Party of Germany
  (1889–1964), Heimwehr
 Werner Bruschke (1898–1995), SPD
  "Appel" (1912–1978), KPD
  (1889–1940), KPO
  (1908–1980), Rote Hilfe
  (1890–1938), Rote Hilfe
  (1901–1934) KPD
  (1905–1945) SPD
 Ernst Busch (actor) (1900–1980), actor, KPD
 Wilhelm Busch (pastor) (1897–1966), Confessing Church

C 

  (1916–1945), 
 Wilhelm Canaris (1887–1945),
 Emil Carlebach (1914–2001), KPD
  (1909–1988), KPD
  (1893–1935), Rote Hilfe
  (1898–1945), Bästlein-Jacob-Abshagen Group
  (d. 1942), KPD
  (1894–1945), KPD
  (1876–1945), SPD

D 

 Jakob Dautzenberg (1897–1979), KPD
 Alfred Delp (1907–1945), Catholic church
  (1907–2000), Rote Hilfe
  (1892–1973), SPD
Marlene Dietrich (1901–1992), actress and singer
  (1908–1992), Socialist Workers' Party of Germany
 Willi Dickhut (1904–1992), KPD
  (1904–1993), SPD
 Hans von Dohnanyi (1902–1945), Confessing Church
 Leo Drabent (1899–1944), Bästlein-Jacob-Abshagen Group
 Fritz Dressel (1896–1933), KPD
  (1896–1976), Ernst Niekisch resistance movement

E 

 Fritz Eberhard (1896–1982), ISK
 Erwin Eckert (1893–1972), BRSD, KPD
 Hugo Eckener (1868–1954), manager of the Luftschiffbau Zeppelin 
 Hans Ehrenberg (1883–1958), Lutheran theologian, a founder of the Confessing Church
 Willi Eichler (1896–1971), ISK
 Ernst Hampel (1919–1945), communist
 Elvira Eisenschneider (1924–1944), NKFD
  (1901–1944), KPD
 Georg Elser (1903–1945), acted alone
  (1907–1942), KPD
 August Enderle (1887–1959), Socialist Workers' Party of Germany
  (1893–1944), KPD
  (1895–1945), KPD
 Leopold Engleitner (1905–2013), Jehovah's Witness
 Fritz Erler (1913–1967), Neu Beginnen
 Anna Essinger (1879–1960), Landschulheim Herrlingen
 Erika Etter (d. 1945), KJVD
  Walter Eucken (1891–1950), economist

F 

 Dora Fabian (1901–1935) Socialist Workers' Party of Germany
Walter Fabian (1902–1995) Socialist Workers' Party of Germany
 Marianne Feldhammer (1909–1996), 
  (1913–1945) KPD
 Hermann Fischer (1912–1984), Rote Hilfe and Brümmer Kleine resistance group
 Mildred Fish-Harnack (1902–1943), Red Orchestra 
 Herbert Frahm see Willy Brandt
 Egon Franke (politician) (1913–1995), SPD
 David Frankfurter (1909–1982), acted alone
  (1909–1943), Neu Beginnen
 Georg Fritze (1874–1939), BRSD
 August Froehlich (1891–1942), Catholic church
 Paul Frölich (1884–1953), Socialist Workers' Party of Germany
 Emil Fuchs (1874–1971), BRSD
  (1894–1933), KPD
 Max Fürst (1905–1978), author
  (1894–1965), SPD

G 

 Johann Gahr (1880–1939), acted alone
 Albrecht Gaiswinkler (1905–1979), Special Operations Executive spy
 Clemens August Graf von Galen (1878–1946), Catholic church
 Willi Gall (1908–1941), KPD
 Jakob Gapp (1897–1943), Catholic church
 Martin Gauger (1905–1941), Confessing Church, Kreisau Circle
 Lisa Gavric (1907–1974), Résistance
 Herta Geffke (1893–1973), Rote Hilfe
  (1905–2002), ISK, ELAS
  (1896–1933), KPD
 Fritz Gerlich (1883–1934), journalist
 Kurt Gerstein (1905–1945), Waffen-SS, Gerstein Report author
 Eugen Gerstenmaier (1906–1986), Confessing Church
 Johann Geusendam (1866–1945), Rote Hilfe
  (1916–2001), KPD
 Peter Gingold (1916–2006), KPD
  (1905–2002), Willy-Fred
 Helene Glatzer (1902–1935), KPD
  (1905–1973), SPD
  (1892–1944), KPD
  (1895–1964) SPD
 Albert Goldenstedt (1912–1994), KPD, Rote Hilfe
 Carl Friedrich Goerdeler (1884–1945), DVNP, Mayor of Leipzig
  (1895–1933), KPD
  (1908–1976), KPD
 Kurt Julius Goldstein (1914–2007), KPD
 Albert Göring (1895–1966), businessman and younger brother of Nazi leader Hermann
  (1897–1949), AfA-Bund, Neu Beginnen, Covenant of Religious Socialists of Germany
 Herta Gotthelf (1902–1963), SPD
 Hugo Gräf (1892–1958), Rote Hilfe
 Willi Graf (1918–1943), White Rose
  (1921–2008), Special Operations Executive spy
  (1907–1990), Rote Hilfe
 Karl Grönsfelder (1882–1964), KPD
  (1896–1944), SPD
 Anneliese Groscurth (1910–1996), European Union (resistance group)
 Georg Groscurth (1904–1944), European Union (resistance group)
 Helmuth Groscurth (1898–1943) Wehrmacht and Abwehr officer
  (1905–1942), KPD
 Otto Grotewohl (1894–1964), SPD
  (1912–1945), KPD, London "Free Germans" of the OSS (precursor to the CIA)
  (1921–1942), Rote Pfadfinder
 Gustav Gundelach (1888–1962), KPD
  (1925–1944), KPD

H 

 Georg Häfner (1900–1942), Catholic church

 Kurt Hälker (1922–2010), Résistance
  (1903–1987), KPD
 Elise Hampel (1903–1943), acted alone with husband Otto
Ernst Hampel (1919–1945), part of the Etter-Rose-Hampel group
 Otto Hampel, (1897–1943), acted alone with wife Elise
 Arvid Harnack (1901–1942), Rote Kapelle (Red Orchestra)
 Werner Hansen (1905–1972), ISK
  (1892–1944), KPD
 Ulrich von Hassell (1881–1944), 20 July plot
 Elli Hatschek (1901–1944) European Union (resistance group)
 Paul Hatschek (1888–1944) European Union (resistance group)
 Theodor Haubach (1896–1945), SPD
  (1912–1951), Rote Hilfe
  (1900–1973), KPO
  (1881–1952), Rote Hilfe
  (1899–1967), 
 Rudolf-Ernst Heiland (1910–1965), IKD
 Ernst Heilmann (1881–1940), SPD
  (1890–1946), SPD, Reichsbanner
  (1910–1944), KPD, Robert Uhrig Group
  (1903–1942), Catholic church
  (1910–1942), IKD
 Georg Henke (1908–1986), KPD
 Albert Hensel (1895–1942), KPD
 Liselotte Herrmann (1909–1938), KPD
  (1903–1943)
  (b. 1906), National Committee for a Free Germany
 Heinz Heydrich (1905–1944), younger brother of Reinhard Heydrich ("The Butcher of Prague")
 Friedrich Hielscher (1902–1990), Konservative Revolution
 Rainer Hildebrandt (1914–2004), Haushofer-Kreis
 Else Himmelheber (1905–1944), resistance group in Schlotterbeck aus Luginsland
  (1900–1990), Trotzkyist
 Else Hirsch (1889–1942 or 1943), schoolteacher, organized 10 children's transports out of Germany
  (1889–1937), SPD
 Walter Hochmuth (1904–1979), KPD
  (1880–1945), SPD
  (1902–1945), Saefkow-Jacob-Bästlein Organization
 Erich Honecker (1912–1994), KPD
  (d. 1944), KPD
Wilm Hosenfeld (1895–1952), Nazi Captain who hid and rescued many Polish people, including Władysław Szpilman
 Kurt Huber (1893–1943), White Rose
 Helmuth Hübener (1925–1942), Hamburg Vierergruppe (German Resistance)
  (1921–2002)
 Alois Hundhammer (1900–1974), at the time, the youngest member of the Bavarian Landtag
 Peter Hüppeler (1913–1944), Ehrenfeld Group

I 
 Karl Ibach (1915–1990), KPD
  (1906–1988), Socialist Workers' Party of Germany
  (1904–1983), SPD, party chairman of Sopade, Belgium

J 

 Franz Jacob (1906–1944), KPD, Bästlein-Jacob-Abshagen Group, Saefkow-Jacob-Bästlein Organization
 Katharina Jacob (1907–1989), KPD, Bästlein-Jacob-Abshagen Group
  (1885–1935), elected legislator from Prussia SPD
 Rudolf Jacobs (1914–1944), (in Italy, naval officer, partisan in Italy with  "Ugo Muccini" Garibaldi brigade)
 Hildegard Jadamowitz (1916–1942), KPD, Herbert Baum Group
 Franz Jägerstätter (1907–1943), Austrian conscientious objector
 Frieda (Friedel) and Rudolf Jahn (d. 1951), Covenant of Religious Socialists of Germany
 Hans Jahn (1885–1960), International Transport Workers' Federation
  (1897–1964), Confessing Church
 Hans Jendretzky (1897–1992), KPD
 Marianne Joachim (1921–1943), Herbert Baum Group
  (1900–1999), KPD
  (1908–1944), KPD
 Franz Jung (1888–1963), KAPD and Rote Kämpfer
  (1903–1945), KPD
  (1902–1975), IKD

K 
 Otto Kahn-Freund (1900–1979) Jurist
 Jakob Kaiser (1888–1961) Zentrumspartei
  (1913–2006), ISK
 Heinz Kapelle (1913–1941), KPD
  (1907–1967), ISK and Independent Socialist Union
 Friedrich Kellner (1885–1970), SPD
 Kilian Kirchhoff (1892–1944), Catholic church
 Johanna Kirchner (1884–1944), SPD, Rote Hilfe
 Ernst Kirchweger (1898–1965), KPÖ
 Heinz Kiwitz (1910–1938), ASSO
 Michael Kitzelmann (1916–1942), Lieutenant in the Wehrmacht
 Erich Klausener (1885–1934), Zentrumspartei, Catholic church
  (1883–1944), KPD
 Walter Klingenbeck (1924–1943), Munich Vierergruppe (German Resistance)
  (1891–1944), Reichsbanner Schwarz-Rot-Gold and Protestant teenagers' group
 Rudolf Klug (d. 1944), KPD
 Wilhelm Knöchel (1899–1944), KPD
  (1906–1971), SPD, Neu Beginnen
  (1893–1944), KPD
  (1924–2016), Edelweißpiraten
 Hans Koch (1893–1945), Jurist, Confessing Church
 Werner Koch (pastor) (1910–1994), Pastor, Confessing Church, brother of Hans Koch
  (1909–2002), ISK
 Bernard Koenen (1889–1964), Rote Hilfe and National Committee for a Free Germany
  (1915–1988), Rote Hilfe
 Olga Körner (1887–1969), KPD
 Fritz Kolbe (1900–1971), acted alone
  (1889–1964), National Committee for a Free Germany
  (1901–1943), KPD
 Walter Kraemer (1892–1941), KPD
  (1916–1944), Austrian Catholic, supported French Resistance (acting alone)
 Heinrich Kratina (1906–1944), Ehrenfeld Group
 Wilhelm Kratz (1902–1944), Ehrenfeld Group
  (1887–1950)
 Johann Krausen (1887–1944), Ehrenfeld Group
 Willi Kreikemeyer (1894–1950), KPD
  (1917–2004), Résistance
 Lothar Kreyssig (1898–1986), Jurist (only judge to intervene in Aktion T4 euthanasia operation), Confessing Church
  (1907–1937), KPD
 Maria Krüger (1907–1987), Rote Hilfe
 Alfred Kubel (1909–1999), ISK
 Adam Kuckhoff (1887–1943), Red Orchestra
 Greta Kuckhoff (1902–1981), Red Orchestra
 Heinz Kühn (1912–1992), SPD
 Otto Kühne (1893–1955), KPD und Résistance
  (1901–1943), KPD
 Albert Kuntz (1896–1945), KPD
  (1895–1944), KPD
  (1887–1942), RSD

L 
 Max Lackmann (1910–2000), Evangelical Church in Germany
  (1909–1944) KPD
 Erwin von Lahousen (1897–1955) military resistance
 Fritz Lange (1898–1981), Independent Social Democratic Party of Germany, KPD, Rotfrontkämpferbund
 Paul Langen (1893–1945)
 Käthe Latzke (d. 1945), KPD
 Julius Leber (1891–1945), SPD
  (1908–1945), SPD
  (1906–1943), IKD
 Hans Conrad Leipelt (1921–1945), White Rose
 Josef Lenzel (1890–1942), Catholic church
 Theodor Lessing (1872–1933), acted alone
  (1910–1965), KPD
 Wilhelm Leuschner (1890–1944), SPD
 Bernhard Lichtenberg (1875–1943), Catholic church
 Hermann Lichtenegger (1900–1984), KPÖ politician
 Simone Arnold Liebster (1930), Jehovah's Witness
  (1900–1967)
 Max Liedtke (1894–1955) Wehrmacht major. 
 Rosa Lindemann (1876–1958), KPD, Rote Hilfe in Berlin-Moabit
 Herta Lindner (1920–1943), KJVD
  (1907–1981), ISK
  (1909–1994), Rote Hilfe and Saefkow-Jacob-Bästlein Organization
 Hans Litten (1903–1938)
 Paul Löbe (1875–1967), SPD
 Max Loeper (Executed 1941), mentioned in 2002 book Shades of Gray by Arthur O. Naujoks Jr. and Michael S. Eldredge, pages 43, 44, 144.
  (1896–1977), Neu Beginnen
 Roland Lorent (1920–1944), Ehrenfeld Group
  (1895–1961), SPD
  (1898–1984)
  (1906–1943 missing), KPD

M 
 Johann Maier (1906–1945) preacher, Regensburger Dom
 Heinrich Maier (1908–1945), theologian 
 Adolf Maislinger (1903–1985), KPD
 Maria von Maltzan (1909–1997), Solf Circle
 Maria Restituta (née Helene Kafka) (1894–1943) Franciscan
 Hilde Meisel (Hilda Monte) (1914–1945), ISK
  (1909–2007), KPD, Résistance
 August Merges (1870–1945), 
  (1896–1945), 
 Max Josef Metzger (1887–1944), Catholic church
 Herbert Michaelis (1898–1939), lawyer, KPD, Michaelis Group
 Carlo Mierendorff (1897–1943), SPD
  (1883–1964), KPD, Rote Hilfe
 Helmuth James Graf von Moltke (1907–1945), founding member, Kreisau Circle
 Mentona Moser (1874–1971), Rote Hilfe
 Erich Mühsam (1878–1934)
 Josef Müller (CSU politician) (1898–1979), Bavarian People's Party, Catholic resistance
 Oskar Müller (1896–1970), KPD

N 
 Harry Naujoks (1901–1983), KPD
 Theodor Neubauer (1890–1945), KPD
  (1891–1943), Rote Hilfe
 , SPD
 Ernst Niekisch (1889–1967), publisher of Widerstand, Magazine for national revolutionary Politics
 Katja Niederkirchner (1909–1944), KPD
 Martin Niemöller (1892–1984), Confessing Church
 Karl Nolan (1891–1937), Rote Hilfe, KPD, father of Fritz and Anna Pröll (see P), one of the first Augsburg Nazi murder victims in Dachau concentration camp
  (1892–1953), SPD
  (1912–2003) Socialist Workers' Party of Germany

O 

  (1912–2003), Aktion Rheinland
  (1890–1982), KPD
 Rudolf Opitz (1908–1939), KPD
  (1900–1978)
 Carl von Ossietzky (1889–1938)
 Hans Oster (1887–1945)

P 
  (1892–1935)
 Resi Pesendorfer (1902–1989) Willy Fred
 Toni Pfülf (1877–1933), member of the SPD
  (1886–1965), Confessing Church
  (1928–2001), Edelweißpiraten
  (1906–1974), Rote Hilfe
  (1920–1969), Westerweel Group
  (1899–1933), KPD
  (d. 1944), SS-Obersturmbannführer with contact with Wilhelm Canaris
 Karl Plagge (1897–1957), Wehrmacht officer, acted alone
  (1906–1973), Communist Party Opposition
 Sepp Plieseis (1913–1966), KPÖ, Willy Fred
  (d, 1943), KPD
 Harald Poelchau (1903–1972), Onkel Emil Group, Confessing Church, BRSD
 Ottilie Pohl (1867–1943), USPD, Rote Hilfe in Berlin-Moabit
 Johannes Popitz (1884–1945),
 Hedwig Porschütz (1900–1977), Righteous among the Nations
  (1907–1945), KPD
  (1900–1971), KPD
 Bernard Povel (called Ben Povel) (1897–1952), Catholic textile manufacturer, Zentrumspartei
 Olga Benario-Prestes (1908–1942), KPD
 Konrad von Preysing (1880–1950), Catholic church
 Christoph Probst (1919–1943), White Rose
 Fritz Pröll (1915–1944), Rote Hilfe
  (1896–1945), Rote Hilfe

R 
  (1899–1971), KPD
 Siegfried Rädel (1893–1943), KPD
 Adolf Reichwein 1898–1944, SPD
 Franz Reinisch (1903–1942), Catholic church
  (1907–1944), Bästlein-Jacob-Abshagen Group
  (1910–1958), ELAS
  (1898–1944), European Union (resistance group)
 Franz Rheinberger (1927–1944), Ehrenfeld Group
 Albert Richter (1912–1940), track cyclist
  (1911–1970), Catholic church
  (1908–1944), Robert Uhrig Group
  (1886–1951), Socialist Workers' Party of Germany
  (1897–1981), DDP Robinsohn-Strassmann Group
  (1915–2008), CVJM
 Beppo Römer (1892–1944), KPD
 Erwin Rommel (1891–1944),Wehrmacht
 Augustin Rösch (1893–1961), Kreisau Circle, Catholic church
  (1902–1991), Catholic church
  (1901–1988), SPD
  (1912–1964), KPD
  (1902–1975), SPD

S 

 Anton Saefkow (1903–1944), Saefkow-Jacob-Bästlein Organization
 Herbert Sandberg (1908–1991), KPD, Association of Revolutionary Visual Artists
 Willi Sänger (1894–1944), KPD
  (ca. 1904–1997), Solf Circle
 Karl Schapper (1879–1941), Catholic
 Werner Scharff (1912–1945), 
 John Schehr (1896–1934), KPD
  (1899–1945), KPD
 Heinrich Scheuken (1902–1944), acted alone
  (1898–1980), SPD
  (1911–1944), KPD
 Emilie Schindler (1907–2001), acted alone
 Oskar Schindler (1908–1974), acted alone
 Bartholomäus (Barthel) Schink (1927–1944), Ehrenfeld Group
 Friedrich Schlotterbeck (1909–1979), KJD, KPD, Schlotterbeck Group
  (1901–1976), SPD
 Anton Schmid (1900–1942), Wehrmacht
 Richard Schmid (1899–1986), counsel, Socialist Workers' Party of Germany (affiliated)
 Otto Schmirgal (1900–1944), KPD
 Elisabeth Schmitz (1893–1977), theologian, resistance fighter, Confessing Church
 Alexander Schmorell (1917–1943), White Rose
 Paul Schneider (1897–1939), pastor, Evangelical Church in Germany
 Ernst Schneller (1890–1944), KPD
  (1899–1976), Sopade, Neu Beginnen
  (d. 1945) KPD
  (1924–1942), Résistance
 Eugen Schönhaar (1898–1934), KPD
  (1889–1933), KPD
 Hans Scholl (1918–1943), White Rose
 Sophie Scholl (1921–1943), White Rose
 Roman Karl Scholz (1912–1944), Catholic church
 Felice Schragenheim (1922–1942), unknown
  (1892–1944), Communist Party Opposition
 Karl Schröder (1884–1950), 
 Friedrich-Werner von der Schulenburg (1875–1944), 20 July plot
 Fritz-Dietlof von der Schulenburg (1902–1944), 20 July plot
 Eduard Schulte (1891–1966), industrialist, acted alone
  (1891–1945), 
 Josef Schulz (1909?–1941), Wehrmacht (disputed)
  (1894–1935), KPD
 Eva Schulze-Knabe (1907–1976), KPD
 Elisabeth Schumacher (1904–1942) Red Orchestra
 Kurt Schumacher (sculptor) (1905–1942) Red Orchestra
 Georg Schumann (resistance fighter) (1886–1945), KPD
 Margarete Schütte-Lihotzky (1897–2000), KPÖ
 Adolf Schütz (1926–1944), Ehrenfeld Group
 Alexander Schwab (1887–1943), 
 Günther Schwarz (1928–1944), Ehrenfeld Group
 Rudolf Schwarz (resistance activist) (1904–1934), KPD
 Werner Seelenbinder (1904–1944), KPD
 Willi Seng (1909–1944), KPD functionary
 Robert Siewert (1887–1973), KPO, Buchenwald Resistance
  (1898–1942), KPD
  (1894–1955), KPD
 Hanna Solf (1884–1954), Solf Circle
 Richard Sorge (1895–1944), KPD spy for the Soviet Union
  (1911–1944) Confessing Church

 Claus von Stauffenberg (1907–1944), 20 July plot
  (1902–1942), KPD
 Wilhelm Stein (d. 1944), KPD
 Hans Steinbrück (1921–1944), Ehrenfeld Group
  (1917–1942), Young Communist League of Germany, Herbert Baum Group
  (1896–1934), Rote Hilfe
  (1900–1933), KPD
  (1897–1958), DDP, 
 Stefan Szende (1901–1985), Socialist Workers' Party of Germany
 Carl Szokoll (1915–2004), Wehrmacht,

T 

 Elisabeth von Thadden (1890–1944), Solf Circle
 Bruno Tesch (antifascist) (1913–1933), KPD
 Ernst Thälmann (1886–1944), KPD
 Fritz Theilen, Ehrenfeld Group
 Matthias Theisen (1885–1933), KPD, SPD
 Paul Thümmel (1902–1945), Abwehr, Czech Resistance 
 Paul Tillich (1886–1965), Christian Socialist, American Friends of German Freedom, Council for a Democratic Germany

U 
  (1890–1968), unionist resistance (DMV)
 Robert Uhrig (1903–1944), KPD

V 

 Kurt Vieweg (1911–1976), KPD
 Franz Vogt (1899–1940), labour unionist, SPD, Reichsbanner Schwarz-Rot-Gold

W 
 Maria Wachter (1910–2010), KPD
  (1905–1943), SPD
 Heinrich Wagner (1886–1945), KPD, Rote Hilfe
 Jacob Walcher (1887–1970), Socialist Workers' Party of Germany
  (1904–1956), KPD
 Eduard Wald (1905–1978), Committee for Proletarian Unity
 Orli Wald (1914–1962), Young Communist League of Germany, "Angel of Auschwitz"
 Maria von Wedemeyer (1924–1977), Confessing Church
  (1889–1945), from SPD- and Socialist Workers' Party of Germany, member of existing resistance group in Zeitz
 Armin T. Wegner (1886–1978), author, medic, soldier and human rights activist, acted alone
 Herbert Wehner (1906–1990), KPD
 Otto Weidt (1883–1947), anarchist resistance
  (1909–1944), Rote Hilfe
 Friedrich Weißler (1891–1937), Confessing Church
  (1884–1940), SPD
  (1889–1960), Lutheran pastor
 Hans Westermann (1890–1935), Versöhnler, KPD
  (1894–1944), European Union (resistance group)
  (1895–1942), SPD
  (1888–1958), Aktion Rheinland
 Albert Willimsky (1890–1940), Catholic church
 , White Rose
 Josef Wirmer (1901–1944), Catholic church
  (1896–1944), artist, acted alone
  (1902–1944), Catholic church
  (1904–1997), Zionist refugee helper in Berlin
 Rosi Wolfstein (1888–1987), Socialist Workers' Party of Germany

Z 
  (1919–2005), Hashomer Hatzair, Herbert Baum Group
 Hiltgunt Zassenhaus (1916–2004), wartime translator and interpreter
 Zita Zehner (1900–1978), home economist and radio host
  (1910–1981), KPD
  (1895–1969) Antinazistische Deutsche Volksfront
  (1910–1940), KPD

See also 
 German Resistance
 Stolpersteine
 List of members of the 20 July plot
 Resistance during World War II
 Friedrich Olbricht
 Kurt Nehrling
 Rudolf Christoph Freiherr von Gersdorff
 Werner Dankwort
 List of cities by country that have Stolpersteine
 List of Righteous among the Nations by country

References

External links
 German Resistance Memorial Center Homepage. Retrieved March 15, 2010

 
Lists of German people
Political repression in Nazi Germany
German people by political orientation
Nazi-related lists
Germany in World War II-related lists